Nieuw-Annerveen ( or ) is a hamlet in the Dutch province of Drenthe. It is a part of the municipality of Aa en Hunze, and lies about 16 km east of Assen.

The hamlet was first mentioned in 1874 as Annerveen (Nieuw). It uses Nieuw (new) to distinguish between Oud-Annerveen. The former school is nowadays used as a village house.

References

Populated places in Drenthe
Aa en Hunze